In Praise of Love may refer to:
In Praise of Love (play), 1973 play by Terence Rattigan
In Praise of Love (film), unrelated 2001 film directed by Jean-Luc Godard